Marko Janković may refer to:

Marko Janković (sprinter) (born 1976), Serbian Olympic sprinter
Marko Janković (footballer, born 1988), Serbian football goalkeeper
Marko Janković (footballer, born 1995), Montenegrin football midfielder
Marc Janko (born 1983), Austrian footballer